Climate change in the Caribbean poses major risks to the islands in the Caribbean. The main environmental changes expected to affect the Caribbean are a rise in sea level, stronger hurricanes, longer dry seasons and shorter wet seasons. As a result, climate change is expected to lead to changes in the economy, environment and population of the Caribbean. Temperature rise of 2 °C above preindustrial levels can increase the likelihood of extreme hurricane rainfall by four to five times in the Bahamas and three times in Cuba and Dominican Republic. In Latin America and the Caribbean, it is expected that 29–32 million people may be affected by the sea level rise because they live below this threshold. The Bahamas is expected to be the most affected because at least 80% of the total land is below 10 meters elevation.

Geography

The Caribbean is an archipelago of islands between North and South America. These islands include Antigua, Aruba, Barbados, Bonaire, the Cayman Islands, Cuba, Curaçao, Dominica, Guadeloupe, Grenada, Hispaniola, Jamaica, Martinique, Montserrat, Puerto Rico, Saba, Saint Croix, Saint Eustatius, Saint John, Saint Kitts, Saint Lucia, Saint Thomas, Saint Vincent, Sint Maarten, the Bahamas, Tortola, and Trinidad and Tobago.

Impacts on the natural environment

Temperature and weather changes

Extreme weather events

An increase in air and sea surface temperature is predicted to promote the development of stronger tropical cyclone. Key factors that lead to the development of hurricanes are the warm temperatures of the air and sea surface. The higher temperatures increase the probability of the storm to become a hurricane. This provides the energy for the hurricane to intensify.

In September 2017, the United States National Hurricane Center reported that the North Atlantic basin was highly active because four tropical storms formed and they all became hurricanes. They report a higher than average record on the number of tropical storms that developed into hurricanes this year. Two of these four hurricanes, Irma and Maria, hit the islands in the Caribbean. Once at the Caribbean, both Irma and Maria became Category 5 hurricanes. In addition to being strong, Hurricanes Irma and Maria also carried more rainfall than previous storms. The warmer the air temperature, the more water can be held by air leading to more precipitation. Multiple sources suggest that this increase in strengthening and precipitation in recent hurricanes is due to climate change. We are seeing repeated and prolonged droughts, an increase in the number of very hot days, intense rainfall events causing repeated localized flooding, and rising sea levels that are consuming the beautiful beaches on which tourism in the region depends.

Temperature rise of 2 °C above preindustrial levels can increase the likelihood of extreme hurricane rainfall by 4–5 times in the Bahamas, 3 times in Cuba and Dominican Republic. Even to the richest nations in the region, it takes 6 years to recover from such event. If the global temperature will rise only by 1.5 °C it will significantly reduce the risk.

Ecosystems 

An increase in surface temperature has also been suggested to affect the coral reefs. In 2005 in the Caribbean, a rise in the sea surface temperature is thought to have caused widespread coral bleaching. In this study, they evaluate if this increase in sea surface temperature was due to natural climate variability or human activity. They concluded that it would be very unlikely that natural climate variability alone could account for this event. Their model suggests that this event would occur once every 1000 years if human activity is not taken into consideration in the model. Coral reefs are a huge part of the Caribbean ocean and an important aspect to their ecosystem. Coral bleaching is an effect of the change in climate because of the rise in water temperature in the seawater. The coral is also being used as a "natural resource" for the natives to create cement and aggregate because they aren't provided with the same materials as are other countries.

Sea level rise
Rising sea levels are expected to cause coastal erosion due to climate change. By 2100, sea level in the Caribbean is expected to rise by 1.4 m.

In Latin America and the Caribbean, it is expected that 29–32 million people may be affected by the sea level rise because they live below this threshold. The Bahamas and Trinidad and Tobago are expected to be the most affected because at least 80% of the total land is below the sea level. 

Coastal losses range between US$940 million to $1.2 billion in the 22 largest coastal cities in Latin America and the Caribbean. Main sources of income, such as tourism, will also be affected because many of the main touristic attractions such as beaches and hotels are near the coast. In 2004, a study reported that 12 million tourists had visited the Caribbean. Damage to the beaches can also negatively impact sea turtles that nest in the Caribbeans. The islands serve as nesting sites and habitats for sea turtles, which are all facing endangerment due to coastal erosion and changes in habitat at all stages of the life cycle. Sea level rise can impact where sea turtles nest and their nesting behavior.

Impacts on people

Multiple sources suggest that the Caribbean is in a particularly difficult position to address climate change. The Caribbean's long history of colonialism for the extraction of goods, such as sugar, has left them dependent on colonial entities. This has created a disadvantage to the Caribbean as they lack the ability to compete with the current world economy and be self-sufficient. Centuries of colonialism has generated a feedback loop of the dependence of the Caribbean's economy on global powers.

The damages expected from climate change will weaken the economy of the Caribbean as it will target some of the major sources of income, like tourism. It has been estimated that 25% to 35% of the Caribbean's economy relies on tourism. Tourism could be significantly reduced if less tourists travel to the Caribbean because of an increase in the strength and likelihood of hurricanes in the next century. It is expected that hurricane costs are expected to range between US$350 million to $550 million or about 11% to 17% of the current GDP for hurricane damages annually. They expect that the Bahamas, Haiti, and Jamaica are the islands that will suffer the most from climate change. In addition, they suggest that agricultural and rural areas are among the sectors that will be most affected by hurricanes in the Caribbean. They estimate that damages to these areas could cost about US$3 million per year by 2050 and US$12 million – $15 million by 2100.

Cultural impacts 
There are a variety of people that live on the Caribbean islands and they are heavily impacted on the effects of climate change. Culturally, the peoples of the Caribbean are a mix of Africa, Asian, European, and Indigenous peoples. Tourism is an important aspect in the Caribbeans economy. Without it economies will collapse and residents will struggle more than they already are. The impact of climate change on tourism will lead to unknown results and many difficulties for the islands. The coastal region, where tourist reside on their trips, is nothing like the original residence for the natives.

Mitigation 
In 2019 week of climate action in Latin America and the Caribbean resulted in a declaration in which leaders says that they will act to reduce emissions in the sectors of transportation, energy, urbanism, industry, forest conservation and land use and "sent a message of solidarity with all the people of Brazil suffering the consequences of the rainforest fires in the Amazon region, underscoring that protecting the world's forests is a collective responsibility, that forests are vital for life and that they are a critical part of the solution to climate change".

Adaptation

In Mesoamerica, climate change is one of the main threats to rural Central American farmers, as the region is plagued with frequent droughts, cyclones and the El Niño- Southern-Oscillation. Although there is a wide variety of adaption strategies, these can vary dramatically from country to country. Many of the adjustments that have been made are primarily agricultural or related to water supply. Some of these adaptive strategies include restoration of degraded lands, rearrangement of land uses across territories, livelihood diversification, changes to sowing dates or water harvest, and even migration. The lack of available resources in Mesoamerica continues to pose as a barrier to more substantial adaptations, so the changes made are incremental.

One of the solutions researchers have come to about reducing  emissions is to raise the market price on carbon. By raising the market price of carbon, it provides signals to consumers to reduce consumption of carbon-intensive goods and services, signals producers to substitute away inputs that are carbon intensive, and market incentives to innovate and adopt new low carbon products and processes. It is important to look at means of reducing  emissions to aid in the long term slowing of climate change since the true costs of climate change are unknown. This is due to the possible changes in technology in the future, existence of irreversibility in policies to cope with the problem, and presence of nonmarket goods and services that are vulnerable to climate change. Researchers say the number one attribute of climate change is lack of enforceable policies.

By country and territory

Grenada

Haiti

Puerto Rico

See also 

 Effects of climate change on island nations
 Impact of hurricanes on Caribbean history
 Hurricane Irma
 Caribbean Sea

References
Added Links:

 https://www.jstor.org/stable/41917607?seq=1#metadata_info_tab_contents CLIMATE CHANGE AND THE CARIBBEAN: REVIEW AND RESPONSE
 https://agupubs.onlinelibrary.wiley.com/doi/abs/10.1029/2010EO160002 Volcanic Vents Found in Deep Caribbean Waters

Further reading
 

Environment of the Caribbean
Regional effects of climate change
Climate change articles needing expert attention
Caribbean